Ihar Kazloŭ, also known as Igor Kozlov, (born ) is a Belarusian male artistic gymnast. He competed at the 2008 Summer Olympics in Beijing. He was also a part of the 2006 Ghent World Cup, where he placed fourth in the rings finals.

He was briefly the coach of former Norwegian national team member Aleksander Lundekvam and other gymnasts at Sotra Turn.

References

1987 births
Living people
Belarusian male artistic gymnasts
Place of birth missing (living people)
Gymnasts at the 2008 Summer Olympics
Olympic gymnasts of Belarus